Arturo Conturbia (4 February 1902 – 1970) was a Swiss athlete. He competed in the men's discus throw at the 1928 Summer Olympics.

References

1902 births
1970 deaths
Athletes (track and field) at the 1928 Summer Olympics
Swiss male discus throwers
Olympic athletes of Switzerland
Place of birth missing